Danielson is a surname literally meaning "son of Daniel".

Notable people
 Bryan Danielson (born 1981), known in WWE as Daniel Bryan, American professional wrestler
 Brianna Danielson (born 1983), known in WWE as Brie Bella, American professional wrestler and wife of Bryan Danielson
David Danielson (19472021), American politician
Gary Danielson (born 1951), American football player and broadcaster
G. C. Danielson, American professor

Patronymic surnames
Surnames from given names